Spring Lake is a lake in Scott County, in the U.S. state of Minnesota.

Spring Lake was so named from the fact it is fed by a spring.

See also
List of lakes in Minnesota

References

Lakes of Minnesota
Lakes of Scott County, Minnesota